The Kural, also known in full as the Tirukkural, is an ancient Tamil treatise on secular ethics and morality.

Kural may also refer to:

 Kural (poetic form), one of the most important forms of classical Tamil language poetry